Pandemis ignescana is a species of moth of the family Tortricidae. It is found in the Russian Far East (Primorsky Krai) and Japan.

The wingspan is about 9 mm for males and 10 mm for females.

The larvae feed on Abies veitchii, Abies nephrolepis and Picea ajanensis.

References

Moths described in 1976
Pandemis